Chigozirim Onyegbule is an Anglican bishop in Nigeria: he is the current Bishop of Ikwanuo, one of nine within the Anglican Province of Aba, itself one of 14 provinces within the Church of Nigeria.

Notes

Living people
Anglican bishops of Ikwuano
21st-century Anglican bishops in Nigeria
Year of birth missing (living people)